Biglerville High School is a small public high school located in the borough of Biglerville, Pennsylvania. It is part of the Upper Adams School District. The high school serves the boroughs of Biglerville, Bendersville, and Arendtsville. It also serves the residents of Tyrone Township, Butler Township, and Menallen Township. As of the 2020–2021 school year, enrollment was 540.

Biglerville High School students may choose to attend Cumberland Perry Vocational Technical School for vocational training. The Lincoln Intermediate Unit IU12 provides the school with a wide variety of services, such as specialized education for disabled students and hearing, speech and visual disability services and professional development for staff and faculty.

Academics 
Biglerville High School offers a small selection of AP courses including:

Human Geography, World History: Modern, 2D Art, 3D Art and Design, Art Drawing, English Literature and Composition, Spanish Language and Culture, French Language and Culture, and Statistics.

The school also offers dual-enrollment classes through Harrisburg Area Community College and Harrisburg University, allowing students to earn college credits while they are still in high school.

Campus 
The high school is housed in a 198,000 square foot building along with Upper Adams Middle School. The building is split into two floors, with classrooms on both levels. 
The school has two gymnasiums and various athletic training spaces. Biglerville's football stadium, Musselman Stadium, is a small grass field with a four-lane track.

Extracurriculars
Biglerville High School offers a wide variety of sports for students to participate in. The school is in Pennsylvania Interscholastic Athletic Association (PIAA) District 3. The school's mascot is a Canner.

Sports
The district funds (as of 2022):

Boys:
Baseball: AAA
Basketball: AAAA
Cross Country: AA
Football: AAA
Soccer: AA
Tennis: AA
Track and Field: AA
Wrestling: AA

Girls:
Basketball: AAA
Cross Country: AA
Field Hockey: A
Soccer: AA
Softball: AAA
Tennis: AA
Track and Field: AA

Band 

The BHS band is a program that offers many music ensemble including: 

 Concert Band
 Marching Band
 Jazz Band
 Indoor Drumline
 Indoor Guard

The Biglerville Band program, until the end of the 2017-2018 school year was led under the direction of Mrs. Jamie Cope. During the 2018-2019 school year, Mr. Rei Phillippi took over as band director. 

Marching Band Titles

Cavalcade of Bands
 Independence A Champions - 2022

Tournament of Bands
 Group 1-Open Atlantic Coast Championships - 2010, 2013, 2014, 2015, 2016, 2017, 2018
 Chapter/Region 6 Championships - 2004, 2006-2013, 2015-2018, 2021

United States Scholastic Band Association (now USBands)
 Group 1 National Championships - 2008

Indoor Drumline Titles

Keystone Indoor Drill Association
 Scholastic Gold Percussion Ensemble - 2004, 2017, 2018
 Scholastic Gold Moving Percussion - 2000, 2008
Tournament Indoor Association
 Chapter 6 Championships Scholastic Intermediate - 2010

Indoor Guard Titles

Keystone Indoor Drill Association
 Scholastic Gold Guard - 2007
 Scholastic White Guard - 2008
 Scholastic Blue Guard - 2013
Tournament Indoor Association
 Chapter 6 Championships Scholastic Intermediate - 2010

See also
 High schools in Pennsylvania

References

External links
 Official website

Public high schools in Pennsylvania
Schools in Adams County, Pennsylvania